Mandeville Canyon is a small community in the Brentwood neighborhood of Los Angeles. Its center is Mandeville Canyon Road, which begins at Sunset Boulevard and extends north towards Mulholland Drive, though it stops short of Mulholland and there is no automotive route between the two. From start to finish, the road gains  in elevation.

History

American era
Rancho San Vicente y Santa Monica included all the property above what is now Pico Boulevard out to the ocean, north to the Santa Monica Mountains towards what is now Encino, east along what is now Ventura Boulevard, and south down to Pico Boulevard. Mandeville Canyon lies on the south slope of the Santa Monicas.

In 1872, the Sepúlveda family decided to sell their property for $55,000 in gold coin to Colonel Robert S. Baker and his wife Arcadia Bandini de Stearns Baker, who thought it would make an excellent sheep ranch. The Bakers sold a 3/4 interest in the land in 1874 for $162,000 to silver miner Nevada Senator John P. Jones.

Mandeville Canyon at that time was known as Casa Viejo Cañon. An 1881 map using this name shows the Casa Viejo Creek running down the middle of the canyon. Records show that the creek carried water year-round, fed by springs in the upper canyon. The name Mandeville Canyon first appeared on a map in the early 1900s as “Mandiville Canon.” The origin of the name is unknown.

In 1904, Baker and Jones formed the Santa Monica Land & Water Company and later sold it to Robert C. Gillis. At the time, Mandeville Canyon’s lush oaks and sycamores and spring-fed creek were reported to be virtually untouched. In 1917, Gillis formed a subsidiary company, the Santa Monica Mountain Park Company, to handle the development of the mountain portion of the land.

1920s

In the early 1920s, the Los Angeles Athletic Club (L.A.A.C.) decided to build a country club community in the Brentwood area. Consequently, the Riviera Country Club was born, as were some of the homes surrounding the golf course. The L.A.A.C. also built three championship polo fields on the site of what is now Paul Revere. Jr. High School. In the ensuing decades, the Beverly Hills Polo Club, a project of oil magnate Russell E. Havenstrite, gathered crowds for matches every Sunday during polo season at the L.A.A.C. fields. Polo players such as C.D. LeBlanc and thoroughbred breeders, including Elizabeth Whitney of Kentucky, bought property in Mandeville and Sullivan Canyon and built houses and stables for their ponies.

In 1926, the Santa Monica Mountain Park Company sold the block closest to Sunset on Mandeville to the L.A.A.C as an extension of its Riviera property and sold most of Lower Mandeville, from Mandeville Lane to Chalon Road, to Garden Foundation, Inc. To encourage sales of the newly subdivided land, Garden Foundation designed and built an elaborate botanical garden with plantings from all over the world, many of which are still in evidence. On the slopes surrounding this garden, they hoped to develop and sell homes. Movie stars dedicated many of the special plantings with commemorative plaques (some of which are still in existence). Two ponds were also built, one of which surrounded the Japanese house at 1900 Mandeville Canyon Road. The second pond was adjacent to the property at 1888 Mandeville Canyon Road.

1930s
Development of the botanical garden slowed down during the Great Depression, and, by 1935, all building ceased. Bondholders of Garden Foundation, who held the original pre-depression mortgage of $4,000,000 for the entire  in Mandeville Canyon, restructured as the Garden Land Company and became the new stockholders. The canyon floor was subsequently subdivided as far as Chalon Road and the first homes were started. Headquarters and sales offices for the Botanic Garden Park was located at 1727 Mandeville Canyon Road. This address later became the home and gardens of the well-known actor Richard Widmark.

During the first half of the 1900s, Mandeville Canyon had a reputation as beautiful riding and hiking country, with its spreading oaks, majestic sycamores and new botanic gardens.  Many long time Brentwood residents remembered riding horses into the canyons and mountains, often camping overnight near Mulholland Drive, during those years.  Also, it was very close to more regimented riding facilities at the L.A.A.C.  This reputation was further solidified during the 1932 Olympics as several equestrian events were held in the Canyon, as well as at the L.A.A.C polo fields.

In 1938 a major flood hit the Mandeville Canyon area, particularly ravaging the lower Mandeville area.  The damage was so extensive that the Garden Land Company remained inactive for the next sixteen years.  However, beginning in the early 1940s, centered mostly around horses, Mandeville Canyon started to become a canyon neighborhood with rustic homes for the well-to-do, including at various times the families of Donald Wills Douglas, Sr. of the Douglas Aircraft Company, Robert McClure (founder of the Santa Monica Evening Outlook newspaper), composer Meredith Willson, and actors Robert Taylor, Eva Marie Saint, Robert Mitchum, Harry Morgan (Morgan's son Charley states that family moved to Mandeville in 1954 and has remained there to present date), Esther Williams, Dick Powell, Don DeFore and others.  Polo players such as Jack Martin Smith and other neighbors would exercise their horses, riding daily across the canyons to play polo at Will Rogers State Historic Park or just down the canyon to the L.A.A.C.

1950s
In 1954 Garden Land resumed development and began building homes again.  The first large tract included approximately 300 homes built in 1957-1958 in upper Mandeville.  At the end of the '50s came other developments known as Westridge and Westridge Terrace on the bulldozed western slopes and hill crests of the canyon.

1960s
In 1963 Garden Land relinquished its holdings to Link Builders, Inc. and Seacrest Co.  The late 60s brought Swartz-Linkletter developing several hundred more properties in the upper canyon, still single-family dwellings but on smaller filled lots.  A plan to develop 3,400 more properties in areas stretching up to Mulholland Drive stopped when the cost of utilities and increased traffic in the canyon were considered and deemed too great.

Emergency services

Police service
Los Angeles Police Department operates the nearby West Los Angeles Community Police Station on Butler Drive near Santa Monica Boulevard and the San Diego (405) Freeway.  This Division also services the Pacific Palisades and Brentwood neighborhoods of the City of Los Angeles

Education
Residents are zoned to schools in the Los Angeles Unified School District. For public elementary school most children attend Kenter Canyon Elementary School. For middle school there is Paul Revere, located at the bottom of Mandeville Canyon. For high school there is Palisades High School. There is also a wide variety of private schools in the area.

References

External links
(Lower) Mandeville Canyon Association
Upper Mandeville Canyon Association

Neighborhoods in Los Angeles
Brentwood, Los Angeles
Populated places in the Santa Monica Mountains
Westside (Los Angeles County)